Gerd von Hassler (or in German Gerd von Haßler) (28 August 1928 – 7 January 1989) was a German author, director, radio broadcaster, composer, singer, journalist and producer.

Life and career

He was born Hans Leo Gerd von Haßler zu Roseneckh near Augsburg, he studied literature, music and ancient history. He later wrote children's plays which he became most famous for and was a radio speaker in which he produced plays (Radio drama). He also produced 27 records with which he composed or arranged music: shanties, student songs and folk music.

After finishing many of his popular radio plays, Hassler took an interest in publishing a number of books. His main interest was studying the legendary continent of Atlantis, which he discussed and documented in various publications such as his 1976 book Noahs Weg zum Amazonas (Noah's route to the Amazon), which was translated in English by the paranormal writer Martin Ebon under the title of The lost survivors of the deluge (1980). In the book Hassler discussed evidence for a global flood due to worldwide flood legends, Sumerians describing a boat similar to Noah's ark, Noah visiting the Amazon and Atlantis being the Garden of Eden. The book is similar to the work of Charles Berlitz but Hassler never received mainstream recognition for his book like Berlitz did.

Published works

Noahs Weg zum Amazonas, (1976) Later printed as Lost Survivors of the Deluge (1980) 
Rätselhaftes Wissen, 1977
Wenn die Erde kippt, 1981
Welt ohne Notausgang, 1984
Der Menschen törichte Angst vor der Zukunft, 1987

References

1928 births
1989 deaths
German male musicians
Male journalists
German untitled nobility
Atlantis proponents
Pseudoarchaeologists
Pseudohistorians
20th-century American historians
20th-century German poets
German male poets
20th-century German journalists
20th-century male musicians